The Bwa languages (Bwamu, Bomu) are a branch of the Gur languages spoken by over half a million Bwa people of Burkina Faso and Mali.

The Bwa people, and their languages, are one of several called Bobo in Bambara. The Bwa are distinguished as the Bobo Wule/Oule "Red Bobo". The Bwa languages are not mutually intelligible; Ethnologue calculates that the intelligibility of the Ouarkoye and Cwi is 30%, though other varieties are closer.

Languages
Bwamu (Ouarkoye)
Láá Láá Bwamu
Cwi Bwamu (Bwamu Twi)
Bomu

References

 
Gur languages
Languages of Burkina Faso
Languages of Mali